Erika Nyström (born 13 September 1983) is a professional Finnish–Cypriot female beach volleyball player. Her twin sister, Emilia, is also a beach volleyball player. She stands 1.79 m (5'10") tall and weighs 68 kg (150 lb).  Erika is the first born of the identical twins and they are both from Muurame, Finland.

References 
 Official website
 AVP Player Bio on Erika Nyström

1983 births
Living people
Finnish beach volleyball players
Cypriot beach volleyball players
Women's beach volleyball players
People from Muurame
Identical twins
Finnish twins
Twin sportspeople
Beach volleyball players at the 2015 European Games
European Games competitors for Finland
Sportspeople from Central Finland
Beach volleyball players at the 2022 Commonwealth Games